The Zone is a 2003 Swedish short film directed by photographer Esaias Baitel. Baitel lived in the Paris suburb of Aubervilliers during the 1970s and, in this short film, he documents what was later to become neo-Nazism.

See also
 The Unnamed Zone

References

External links
 

2003 short documentary films
Swedish short documentary films
Neo-Nazism in France
Films about neo-Nazism
Documentary films about racism
Documentary films about Paris
Seine-Saint-Denis
2000s Swedish films